{{Infobox cricket team
| name                  = Nepal
| image                 = File:Nepal national cricket team.svg
| nickname              = The RhinosGorkhalis| image_size            = 
| alt                   = 
| caption               = Emblem of Cricket Association of Nepal
| association           = Cricket Association of Nepal
| captain               = Rohit Paudel
| coach                 = Monty Desai
| icc_status            = Associate member with ODI status
| icc_member_year       = 1996
| icc_region            = Asia
| odi_rank              = 15th 
| odi_rank_best         = 14th (3 May 2019) 
| t20i_rank             = 16th 
| t20i_rank_best        = 11th (3 May 2019) 

| first_odi             = v  at VRA Cricket Ground, Amstelveen; 1 August 2018
| most_recent_odi       = v  at Tribhuvan University International Cricket Ground, Kirtipur; 16 March 2023 

| num_odis              = 49
| num_odis_this_year    = 12
| odi_record            = 26/21(1 tie, 1 no result)
| odi_record_this_year  = 11/1(0 ties, 0 no results)

| wcq_apps              = 3
| wcq_first             = 2001
| wcq_best              = 8th (2018)

| first_t20i            = v  at Zohur Ahmed Chowdhury Stadium, Chittagong; 16 March 2014
| most_recent_t20i      = v  at Gymkhana Club Ground, Nairobi; 30 August 2022 
| num_t20is             = 57
| num_t20is_this_year   = 0
| t20i_record           = 33/23(0 ties, 1 no result)
| t20i_record_this_year = 0/0(0 ties, 0 no results)

| wt20_apps             = 1
| wt20_first            = 2014
| wt20_best             = First round (2014)
| wt20q_apps            = 4
| wt20q_first           = 2012
| wt20q_best            = 3rd (2013)

| a_pattern_la          = _redborder
| a_pattern_b           = _collarred
| a_pattern_ra          = _redborder
| a_pattern_pants       = 
| a_leftarm             = 000099
| a_body                = 000099
| a_rightarm            = 000099
| a_pants               = 000099
| a_title               = ODI and T20I kit

| asofdate              = 16 March 2023
}}

The Nepal National Cricket Team nicknamed The Rhinos and Gorkhalis, represents the country of Nepal in International cricket and is governed by the Cricket Association of Nepal (CAN). They have been an Associate Member of the International Cricket Council (ICC) since 1996. Nepal were awarded Twenty20 International (T20I) status by the ICC in June 2014 until the 2015 ICC World Twenty20 Qualifier. On 15 March 2018, Nepal gained One Day International (ODI) status for the first time (and regained Twenty20 International status), after winning the first playoff match in the 2018 Cricket World Cup Qualifier.
Nepal made its maiden appearance in the ICC global event at the 2014 ICC World Twenty20 in Bangladesh. They have been participating in international matches since 1996, including every ACC Trophy tournament except 2015 ACC Twenty20 Cup in UAE, where they didn't participate. Nepal also participated in ICC World Cup Qualifier in 2001 2014 and 2018, ICC World Twenty20 Qualifier in 2012, 2013 and 2015, ICC Intercontinental Cup in 2004 and 2005, ACC Fast Track Countries Tournament in 2004, 2005 and 2006, ACC Twenty20 Cup in 2007, 2009, 2011 and 2013, Asian Games in 2010 and 2014 and ACC Premier League in 2014.

Unlike some other smaller cricketing nations, where teams are largely made up of expatriates, Nepal's national team comprises indigenous players who have usually come through the ranks playing age-group cricket.

On 15 March 2018 Nepal claimed One Day International (ODI) status for the first time with a win over Papua New Guinea in the 2018 Cricket World Cup Qualifier 9th place play off encounter. In April 2018, the ICC decided to grant full Twenty20 International (T20I) status to all its members. Therefore, all Twenty20 matches played between Nepal and other ICC members after 1 January 2019 became full T20I matches.

 History 

 Beginnings 
According to the 1877 book, History of Nepal edited by Daniel Wright:  
Over time, cricket came to be considered a gentleman's sport, and involvement was limited mainly to the ruling Rana family and other members of the Nepali elite.

In 1946, the Cricket Association of Nepal was formed to promote cricket amongst the aristocracy. After the introduction of democracy through the Revolution of 1951, cricket began to spread to the rest of the population. In 1961, in an effort to promote cricket to the whole of Nepal, the Cricket Association of Nepal became part of the National Sports Council. Nevertheless, the National games tended to be limited to Kathmandu until the 1980s.

 ICC membership 

Improvements to communications and transport infrastructure in Nepal allowed the game to expand outside Kathmandu in the 1980s and Nepal became an Affiliate Member of the International Cricket Council in 1988. A major development program was begun in the early 1990s, which saw regional and district tournaments being established and the increased promotion of cricket in schools.

The local population's interest in cricket increased quickly, and the demand to play was such that restrictions had to be placed on the number teams in several tournaments until more facilities could be built in the mid-1990s. Nepal became an Associate Member of the International Cricket Council on February 2, 1996, which was the year the national side played for the first time in the 1996 ACC Trophy in Kuala Lumpur. Nepal finished fourth out of six teams in their first round group, beating Brunei and Japan.

By 1998, the facilities in Nepal had improved sufficiently to allow them to host that year's ACC Trophy at grounds in Lalitpur and Kirtipur (at TU Cricket Ground) and Kathmandu. Nepal themselves were unsuccessful in the tournament, going without a win.

Currently, the country has one of the best fan followings among ICC Associate Members. It lost its governing body, the Cricket Association of Nepal (CAN) which was suspended by the International Cricket Council (ICC) due to unnecessary government interference in 2016, but it was reinstated in October 2019.

 T20I status and series 

On 28 June 2014, the ICC awarded T20I status to Nepal, who took part and performed exceptionally well in the 2014 ICC World Twenty20. Nepal had already played three T20I matches before gaining the status, as the ICC had earlier announced that all matches at the 2014 ICC World Twenty20 would have T20I status.
 First ever T20I match for NepalNepal lost the status in July 2015, after failing to qualify for the 2016 ICC World Twenty20.

Nepal played their first ever Twenty20 International series against Hong Kong in November 2014 in Sri Lanka. Initially the series was scheduled for three matches but only one match was played because of continuous rain and poor ground conditions. Nepal lost the match but Sompal Kami put in impressive performance by scoring 40 off 31 balls, coming in at No. 10. This was the world-record for the highest score made by a batsman at that position.

Nepal played their second Twenty20 International series against the Netherlands from 30 June to 3 July 2015. Nepal lost the 4 match series 3–1. Paras Khadka was named the player of the series.

 21st century 

 2000 – 2009 

In 2000, Nepal's youth development policy began to pay off when the Nepal national under-19 cricket team finished eighth in the Under-19 World Cup. The senior side had their best performance to date later in the year when they reached the semi-finals of the 2000 ACC Trophy before losing to Hong Kong at Sharjah. They competed in the ICC Trophy for the first time the following year. In the tournament in Ontario, they beat Germany and Gibraltar, but a loss to eventual runners-up Namibia prevented them from progressing past the first round.

Nepal were runners-up to the UAE in the 2002 ACC Trophy in Singapore and they hosted the ACC Emerging Nations Tournament in 2003, winning easily against Bhutan and the Maldives. They won so comprehensively that they were not invited back to the tournament the next time it was played in 2005. Raju Khadka became the first Nepalese cricketer to score an international century, when he slammed an unbeaten 105 off just 50 balls against Bhutan in the tournament.

Nepal played first-class cricket for the first time in 2004, playing in the ICC Intercontinental Cup against the UAE and Malaysia. They beat Malaysia, but drew with the UAE, failing to reach the semi-final stage. Nepal finished third in the 2004 ACC Fast Track Countries Tournament, which qualified them for the 2005 ICC Intercontinental Cup, and finished 5th in the 2004 ACC Trophy, which qualified them for the repêchage tournament of the 2005 ICC Trophy. They finished third in this tournament after beating Qatar in a play-off, meaning that they did not qualify for the 2005 ICC Trophy. Shakti Gauchan scored a century against Italy and stayed unbeaten on 106 off 103 balls in the tournament. They beat the UAE and drew with Hong Kong in the 2005 ICC Intercontinental Cup, but missed out on qualification for the semi-finals by half a point. They were runners-up to the UAE in the 2005 ACC Fast Track Countries Tournament.

In March 2006, Nepal played Namibia in Windhoek in a play-off match to decide the final team in the 2006 ICC Intercontinental Cup. Nepal needed to win outright to qualify for the main tournament, but the match was drawn after there was no play on the first day. Later in the year, they toured Pakistan, playing against the Pakistan Cricket Academy before playing in the 2006 ACC Trophy in Kuala Lumpur.

In the 2006 ACC Trophy, Nepal bowled Myanmar out for just 10 off 12.1 overs after Nepal won the toss and sent Myanmar in; no batsman scored more than one, the innings included five ducks, and extras top scored with five (three leg byes and two wides). Mehboob Alam and Binod Das picked up seven wickets and three wickets respectively. In reply, Nepal hit three off the first ball, followed by three wides that went for five, and then hit another three from the second legitimate delivery to win by ten wickets. Some critics called it the greatest mismatch in the history of international cricket and the score of 10 is the lowest in any level of men's international cricket. They finished fourth in the tournament after losing to Afghanistan in a play-off. They won the ACC Premier League in 2006.

They played in the 2007 ACC Twenty20 Cup in Kuwait, where they finished fourth in their first round group.

In May 2008, Nepal traveled to Jersey to play in 2008 ICC World Cricket League Division Five of the World Cricket League. Mehboob Alam set the world record by taking all ten wickets in the match against Mozambique. He got his name in the Guinness World Records for becoming the first bowler to take all 10 wickets in an ICC international cricket match with limited overs. Nepal topped Group A after the group qualifying matches but lost to Afghanistan in the semi-final and finished third overall after defeating the USA in the playoff for third place. With only the top two from this tournament qualifying for 2008 ICC World Cricket League Division Four in Tanzania later in the year, Nepal missed out on the chance to take their 2011 World Cup dream any further. Later, Nepal appeared in the 2008 ACC Trophy Elite and finished fourth after losing to the UAE in the semi-final and to Afghanistan in the playoff for third place.

Nepal finished fifth in the 2009 ACC Twenty20 Cup after beating Singapore by 9 wickets in the playoff for fifth place. In a group match against Kuwait, Nepal needed 7 runs off the last ball to win. Binod Bhandari, making his debut for the national team, hit a last-ball six to tie the match. Eventually Nepal won the match in bowl-out.

 2010 – 2014 
Nepal won their first major tournament, beating USA in the final of 2010 ICC World Cricket League Division Five held at Kathmandu in February 2010. Sharad Vesawkar scored a century and stayed unbeaten on 105 off 134 balls against Fiji in the tournament. Nepal played very well in 2010 ACC Trophy Elite, winning all the matches in group stage and beating Malaysia in the semi-final by 8 runs but lost the final against an ODI team Afghanistan by 95 runs and finished runners-up. Nepal came third in 2010 ICC World Cricket League Division Four, thus remaining in Division Four for 2012 ICC World Cricket League Division Four. In November, Nepal appeared in 2010 Asian Games and lost against Sri Lanka in the quarter-final. It was the first match Nepal had played against a Full Member nation.

In December 2011, Nepal hosted the 2011 ACC Twenty20 Cup and finished fourth, thereby qualifying for the 2012 ICC World Twenty20 Qualifier.

Nepal finished seventh in the 2012 ICC World Twenty20 Qualifier after defeating Kenya and Papua New Guinea in play-offs. Shakti Gauchan took the first international hat-trick for Nepal against Denmark in the tournament. In September 2012, Nepal appeared in 2012 ICC World Cricket League Division Four, where Subash Khakurel and Anil Mandal both scored century. Subash Khakurel scored 115 off 142 balls against United States and Anil Mandal scored 113 off 134 balls against Denmark. In a match against Malaysia, Shakti Gauchan set up Nepal's convincing victory with a new record. The left-arm orthodox spinner's figures of 10–8–2–3 is the best economical bowling spell ever in limited over encounters. Nepal won all the six matches of the tournament and progressed to 2013 ICC World Cricket League Division Three. Nepalese players won man of the match awards in all the six matches Nepal played and Basanta Regmi won the player of the tournament award after taking a total of 21 wickets in the tournament. In October, Nepal competed in 2012 ACC Trophy Elite and had to share the trophy with the UAE after a thrilling tied final in Sharjah Cricket Stadium, UAE on 12 October 2012. UAE posted 241, a target that looked in Nepal's sight after their 94-run opening stand. However, they lost wickets consistently, and eventually needed 12 off the last over with just two wickets in hand. Shakti Gauchan smacked Shadeep Silva's left-arm for a six, but could manage only one run off the last ball, hence ending a splendid final match in a tie. Skipper Paras Khadka scored an unbeaten 106 off just 77 balls against Kuwait, his maiden century for Nepal, in the tournament.

Nepal competed in 2013 ACC Twenty20 Cup held at home grounds in Kirtipur and Lalitpur. Nepal easily marched towards the final of the tournament with high class performance from their captain, Paras Khadka, and the team thrashed the UAE by 6 wickets. Nepal had earlier qualified for 2013 ICC World Twenty20 Qualifier, reaching the semi-final of the tournament. Nepal had to be satisfied with runners-up status after losing to an ODI team Afghanistan by 7 wickets. The Nepalese team was supported by a huge fan following throughout this tournament with an average turnout of 15,000 – 20,000 (about 25,000 in the semi-final and final) during their matches while hundreds of thousands watched live on television – undoubtedly the largest public support outside the Test-playing nations. Nepal won the 2013 ICC World Cricket League Division Three held in Bermuda and qualified for the 2014 World Cup Qualifier. Nepal also played in 2013 ACC Emerging Teams Cup, where under-23 age level teams of the four Test nations – Bangladesh, India, Pakistan and Sri Lanka took part along with the UAE, Afghanistan and the hosts Singapore. Nepal finished third in 2013 ICC World Twenty20 Qualifier held in UAE and qualified for the 2014 ICC World Twenty20, defeating Hong Kong off the last ball of the thrilling quarter-final.

Nepal missed out on qualification for the 2015 World Cup, finishing ninth in the 2014 World Cup Qualifier in New Zealand in January. Nepal were the best of the three associate teams on display in Group A of the 2014 ICC World Twenty20. They comprehensively beat Hong Kong, held their own with the bat against Bangladesh and pulled off a strong win against Afghanistan, their first since 2004 in any format against their old rivals. Nepal's bowlers did not bowl a single wide or no ball throughout the tournament. Nepal were also the only team to not concede 140 in an innings in the tournament. Nepal finished third in the 2014 ACC Premier League, where they beat ODI teams UAE and Hong Kong, and qualified for the 2014 ACC Championship. In September, Nepal participated in the 2014 Asian Games but failed to qualify beyond quarter-finals. Nepal won the 2014 ICC World Cricket League Division Three held in Malaysia and qualified for the 2015 ICC World Cricket League Division Two. Gyanendra Malla scored his maiden century, 114 off 125 balls, against Singapore in the tournament. In November, Nepal toured Sri Lanka, as Sri Lanka Cricket approved a request from the Asian Cricket Council to support the region's Non-Test playing countries, where they played two three-day matches against Sri Lanka Cricket Combined XI. and a Twenty20 International series against Hong Kong.

 2015 – 2019 

Nepal finished fourth in the 2015 ICC World Cricket League Division Two in Namibia and qualified for the 2015–17 ICC World Cricket League Championship. But Nepal failed to secure promotion to Division One and qualification to 2015–17 ICC Intercontinental Cup after finishing third in the round-robin stage. Basanta Regmi became the first bowler to take 100 wickets in the World Cricket League. He achieved this feat after taking 2 wickets against Netherlands in the tournament. On 11 April 2015, Nepal hosted a 63-over (31.3 overs per side) tribute match in honour of the Australian cricketer Phillip Hughes who was batting on 63 when he was struck by a bouncer. The match was played at the TU Cricket Ground, Kirtipur between Team Red, combined of players of Nepal and Australia and Team Blue, composed of all Nepalese players. In June, Nepal toured Netherlands to play a Twenty20 International series against the home team. Then Nepal appeared in the 2015 ICC World Twenty20 Qualifier held in Ireland and Scotland, where the team finished seventh in the Group A, thus failing to qualify for the second consecutive ICC World Twenty20.

Nepal finished second in 2018 ICC World Cricket League Division Two to earn a place in the 2018 Cricket World Cup Qualifier. On 15 March, Nepal claimed One Day International (ODI) status for the first time with their win over Papua New Guinea in the 2018 Cricket World Cup Qualifier 9th place play off encounter. Due to gaining ODI status, Nepal also regained Twenty20 International (T20I) status. After gaining ODI status, Nepal's captain at the Cricket World Cup Qualifier, Paras Khadka, said that they want to gain Test status, which he believes will take between eight and ten years to achieve.

Nepal played their first 3 match ODI series against UAE and won 2–1, their first ODI series win. Paras Khadka became the first batsman to score an ODI century for Nepal. Sundeep Jora became the world's youngest player to score a half-century in T20I format, at the age of 17 years and 103 days. In October 2019, the Cricket Association of Nepal, which was suspended in 2016, was readmitted as an ICC member.

 2020 – present 

Nepal hosted United States and Oman in the fifth round of the 2019–2023 ICC Cricket World Cup League 2 in February 2020. In the last match of the series, Nepal bowled out the United States for the joint-lowest total of 35 in ODI cricket. Kushal Malla (Nep) made his ODI debut, and at the age of 15 years and 340 days, he became the youngest male cricketer to score an international half-century while playing against the USA on February 8, 2020.

Nepal hosted the Netherlands and Malaysia in the 2020–21 Nepal Tri-Nation Series in April 2021. Nepal finished top in the points table winning three out of four group matches and qualified for the final, where they played against the Netherlands. Nepal comprehensively beat the Netherlands by 142 runs and won the series. Kushal Bhurtel, making his debut for Nepal, scored 278 runs in the series at an average of 69.50 and a strike rate of 140.40 and won the Player of the series award.

2019–2023 ICC Cricket World Cup League 2 Points Table

International grounds
Tribhuvan University Cricket Ground in Kirtipur, Kathmandu and Pokhara Rangashala in Pokhara are the only venues to have hosted an international match so far. Mulpani Cricket Stadium in Kathmandu and Fapla Cricket Ground in Dhangadhi have also been used for some domestic matches.

 Tournament history 

 World Cup 

 ICC T20 World Cup 

 World Cup Qualifier 

{| class="wikitable" style="text-align: center;"
|-
!colspan="8"|ICC Trophy/World Cup Qualifier record
|-
! width=150 |Year
! width=100 |Round
! width=75  |Position
! width=50  |P
! width=50  |W
! width=50  |L
! width=50  |T
! width=50  |NR
|-
| 1979 || colspan="7" rowspan="3" |Not eligible – Not an ICC member
|-
| 1982
|-
| 1986
|-
| 1990 || colspan="7" rowspan="2" |Not eligible – ICC affiliate member
|-
| 1994
|-
| 1997 || colspan="7" |Did not participate
|-
| 2001 || Group stage || Round 1 || 5 || 4 || 1 || 0 || 0
|-
| 2005 || colspan="7" |Did not qualify
|-
| 2009 || colspan="7" |Not eligible – In Division Five
|-
| 2014 || Super Sixes || 9th || 6 || 1 || 5 || 0 || 0
|-
| 2018 || Playoffs || 8th || 6 || 2 || 4 || 0 || 0
|-
|  2023 || colspan="7" |Qualified
|-
!Total
!colspan="2"|
!17
!7
!10
!0
!0
|}

ICC T20 World Cup Qualifier 

2012: 7th place
2013: 3rd place (Qualified for 2014 ICC World Twenty20)
2015: 12th place
2019: Did not qualify
2022: 3rd place

World Cricket League 

2008 Division Five: 3rd place
2010 Division Five: Champions
2010 Division Four: 3rd place
2012 Division Four: Champions
2013 Division Three: Champions
2014 Division Three: Champions
2015 Division Two: 4th place
2015–17 Championship: 7th place
2018 Division Two: Runners-Up

ICC Intercontinental Cup 

2004: First round
2005: First round
2006–07: Did not qualify
2007–08: Did not participate
2009–10: Not eligible – In Division Five
2011–13: Not eligible – In Division Four
2015–17: Did not qualify

ACC Championship 

2014: Called-off

ACC Fast Track Countries Tournament 

2004: 3rd place
2005: Runners-up
2006: Winners

ACC Premier League 

2014: 3rd place

ACC Trophy 

1996: First round
1998: First round
2000: Semi-finals
2002: Runners-up
2004: 5th place
2006: 4th place
2008: 4th place
2010: Runners-up
2012: Winners (Shared trophy with UAE)

ACC Twenty20 Cup 

2007: Group stage
2009: 5th place
2011: 4th place
2013: Runners-up
2015: Did not participate

Asian Games 

2010: Quarter-finals
2014: Quarter-finals

South Asian Games 

2019: Bronze

ACC Eastern Region T20
 2018: Did not participate
 2020: 4th place

Asia Cup Qualifier 
2018: 4th Place
2020: Did not qualify

Honours

Others
South Asian Games
 Bronze Medal (1): 2019

Records and Statistics 

International Match Summary – Nepal

Last updated 16 March 2023

One Day Internationals 

Highest team total: 297 v Papua New Guinea, 9 March 2023 at Tribhuvan University International Cricket Ground, Kirtipur
Highest individual score: 126, Rohit Paudel v Papua New Guinea, 25 March 2022 at Tribhuvan University International Cricket Ground, Kirtipur
Best individual bowling figures: 6/11, Sandeep Lamichhane v Papua New Guinea, 10 September 2021, at Al Amerat Cricket Stadium, Muscat

Most ODI runs for Nepal

Most ODI wickets for Nepal

ODI record versus other nations

Records complete to ODI #4537. Last updated 16 March 2023.

Twenty20 Internationals 

Highest team total: 238/3 v Netherlands, 24 April 2021 at Tribhuvan University International Cricket Ground, Kirtipur
Highest individual score: 110*, Dipendra Singh Airee v Malaysia, 2 April 2022 at Tribhuvan University International Cricket Ground, Kirtipur
Best individual bowling figures: 5/9, Sandeep Lamichhane v Kenya, 29 August 2022 at Gymkhana Club Ground, Nairobi

Most T20I runs for Nepal

Most T20I wickets for Nepal

T20I record versus other nations

Records complete to T20I #1752. Last updated 30 August 2022.

Current squad 
The following is a list of centrally contracted players or players that were named in the ODI or T20I squads in the past year.

Coaching staff

Coaching history
2001:  Aftab Baloch
2001–2010:  Roy Dias
2011–2016:  Pubudu Dassanayake
2017–2019:  Jagat Tamata
2019–2020:  Umesh Patwal
2020:  Jagat Tamata (interim)
2020–2021:  Dav Whatmore
2021–2022:  Pubudu Dassanayake
2022:  Manoj Prabhakar
2023–present:  Monty Desai

See also

 Cricket Association of Nepal
 Nepal women's national cricket team
 Nepal national under-19 cricket team
 List of Nepal One Day International cricketers
 List of Nepal Twenty20 International cricketers
 List of Nepalese First-class cricketers
 List of Nepalese List A cricketers
 List of Nepalese Twenty20 cricketers
 Everest Premier League
 Dhangadhi Premier League
 National League Cricket
 SPA Cup
 List of Nepal One Day International records
 List of Nepal Twenty20 International cricket records
 Prime Minister One Day Cup
 Prime Minister Cup Women's National Tournament

References

External links

Cricket teams in Nepal
National cricket teams
Nepal in international cricket
C